Apaadi is a 2009 Yoruba language Nigerian film. It's the first film directed by actress Funke Akindele and she also starred as one of the main characters in the movie, playing the King's niece. The film was nominated in the 2009 African Movie Academy Awards in the "best film in an African language" and "achievement in costume" categories, and Femi Adebayo was nominated for best supporting actor for his performance.

Awards and Nominations

References

External links
http://www.nigeriafilms.com/content.asp?contentid=4053&ContentTypeID=9
https://web.archive.org/web/20100420050830/http://www.naijarules.com/vb/yoruba-movies-stars/31724-funke-akindele-movies.html
https://movies.codedwap.com/download/apaadi-part-1-flashback-friday-now-on-sceneonetv-app-www-sceneone-tv/LS1GWFhCTzlHazY1VQ
https://movies.codedwap.com/download/apaadi-part-2-flashback-friday-now-on-sceneonetv-app-www-sceneone-tv/LS1hNUFESWIyaExTRQ
http://www.afrikanmovies.com/Scripts/default.asp 

2009 films
Nigerian drama films